William Keith Campbell is an American social psychologist known for his research on narcissism. He is a professor in the Department of Psychology in the University of Georgia's Franklin College of Arts and Sciences. He completed his BA at University of California, Berkeley, MA from University of California, San Diego, PhD at University of North Carolina at Chapel Hill. He has published over 120 peer-reviewed papers and a number of books, including The Handbook of Narcissism and Narcissistic Personality Disorder: Theoretical Approaches, Empirical Findings, and Treatments (with Joshua Miller) and The Narcissism Epidemic: Living in the Age of Entitlement (with Jean Twenge).

Books
2020: The New Science of Narcissism: Understanding One of the Greatest Psychological Challenges of Our Time—and What You Can Do About It (with Carolyn Crist)
2011: The Handbook of Narcissism and Narcissistic Personality Disorder By W. Keith Campbell, Joshua D. Miller
2010: The Narcissism Epidemic: Living in the Age of Entitlement By Jean M. Twenge, W. Keith Campbell
2005: When You Love a Man Who Loves Himself

References

External links
Faculty page

American social psychologists
University of Georgia faculty
University of California, Berkeley alumni
San Diego State University alumni
University of North Carolina at Chapel Hill alumni
American psychologists